Stratosphere Girl (also known as The Stratosphere Girl in the United States) is a 2004 film from Germany written and directed by .

The film is about a teenage girl who likes drawing Manga but ended traveling to Japan to work at an exclusive club for rich businessmen. She discovers disturbing case of murder as the film goes on.

Plot

Teenager Angela (Chloé Winkel), who is skilled at drawing, meets and falls in love with an attractive Japanese DJ.  Encouraged by him, she goes to Japan to work at an exclusive club for rich businessmen, who like to meet with young blonde women.  From the start, the film is surreal with unique characters, clear and sharp cinematography, and slow panning camera work. Manga drawings are also used to enhance the plot and ambiance.

Angela seeks work at the aforementioned club and, after having been begrudgingly let in, she is met with derision by the other girls working there. However, despite having spurned some of the other girls, she soon proves to be a favorite among the patrons by pretending to be a Lolita-style 15-year-old to please the businessmen.

The plot has a sinister undertone of the possibility of murder of a girl, Larissa, whom Angela has replaced.  As the film goes on, we learn Larissa was possibly murdered, not by Japanese men in search of sick sexual fantasy fulfillment, but at the envious and jealous hands of her workmates.  In the last scenes we learn Larissa lives and, furthermore, this is when Angela is heralded with the contract to be a Manga artist.

External links
Official site

2004 films
2004 romantic drama films
2000s English-language films
Films set in Japan
Films shot in Cologne
German coming-of-age drama films
Films about interracial romance
Films about comics
Films about fictional painters
Japan in non-Japanese culture
2000s German films